Amanda Junquera Butler (19 October 1898 – 27 December 1986) was a Spanish writer. Raised in Madrid, she attended university during the Spanish Civil War at the University of Valencia. Junquera was a noted translator, chronicler, and short story writer in the mid-20th century, whose works and impact received new interest in the 21st century with republishing of some of her works and scholarship on her life.

Early life
Amanda Junquera Butler was born on 19 October 1898 in Madrid to Emilia Butler and Tomás Junquera de Basañez. She grew up in Madrid along with her five siblings, Isabel, María Luisa, Emilia, María Teresa, and Tomás. She enjoyed reading and from a young age, traveled widely and studied music and literature. In July 1928, at the Santa Bárbara Parish Church of Madrid, she married the academic and dean of the Faculty of Arts for the University of Murcia, . Junquera continued traveling widely after her marriage, moving as was required for Alcázar's career.

Career
Conde was the wife of poet, Antonio Oliver Belmás and would become the first woman admitted into the Royal Spanish Academy. The two women had an immediate affinity for each other and began exchanging books and letters. Within a month of their meeting, Conde was dedicating poems to Junquera, which explicitly described her desire for engaging with Amanda using all of her senses and alluding to Katherine Mansfield in language widely known as lesbian coding in the period. Just over a year after meeting, in June 1937, the two women planned a holiday together, without their husbands, at Penyal d'Ifac Natural Park in Valencia, where they became lovers.

During the Spanish Civil War (1936–1939) the women cemented their relationship, as their husbands were away and they were able to continue to meet and correspond. Both husbands had volunteered to serve in the Spanish Republican Army and both served in Baza, Granada. Conde's husband, Oliver, was captured and imprisoned, while Junquera's husband, Alcázar, was transferred to the University of Valencia, and would become Director-General of Universities under Francisco Franco's dictatorship. Junquera enrolled in classes at the University of Valencia, when she returned from her holiday at Peñón de Ifach.

At the end of the war, authorities marked Conde for arrest because she was a pro-Republican intellectual. Junquera helped her escape from Valencia and they moved into the home of Junquera's sister in Madrid. For a year, they lived with the sister, where Conde hid in a bedroom. In 1940, the women moved to San Lorenzo de El Escorial and then in 1942, Alcázar joined them in Madrid. He and Junquera rented #5 Calle Velintonia from poet, Vicente Aleixandre, which would be the home for the three of them off and on for the next four decades. It was in the early 1940s, that Junquera began to publish, using the pseudonym Isabel de Ambía. She wrote essays, chronicles, literary critiques, and short stories which were mainly published in magazines like Cuadernos de Literatura Contemporánea (Contemporary Literature Notes), Destino de Barcelona (Destiny Barcelona), El Español (The Spanish), and Hispania.

From 1942, Junquera translated literary works of English, French, and Italian writers into Spanish. She also published stories throughout the 1940s. In 1947, Junquera published her only book, Un hueco en la luz (A Hollow in the Light).

When Oliver was finally released from prison, he and Conde agreed to remain married in name only. Oliver was required to live in isolation in Murcia, but Conde returned to El Escorial, where she could be with Junquera. When Conde was accused of political offenses, Junquera and Alcázar used their influence to help her get the charges dismissed. Suffering from a heart condition, Oliver was allowed to return to Madrid in 1945 and Conde ostensibly lived with him and his mother in a separate apartment. The two couples remained close, often vacationing together in spite of the complicated relationships. Junquera's husband died in 1958 and she and Conde remained constant companions. When Oliver died in 1968, Conde permanently moved into Junquera's home.

Death and legacy
Junquera died on 27 December 1986 in Madrid and she was buried in the cemetery in Torrelodones. Though she was often overshadowed by their fame, both Conde and Alcázar dedicated multiple works to her in recognition of her significance in their own literary productions. Revived interest in her works began in the 21st century and her biography was included in volume 2 of the Indice Biográfico de España, Portugal e Iberoamérica (Biographical Indices of Spain, Portugal and Latin America, Walter de Gruyter, 2000). Several of her translations also were republished in 2000 and 2001. In 2007, José Luis Ferris published Carmen Conde: vida, pasión y verso de una escritora olvidada (Carmen Conde: Life, Passion and Verse of a Forgotten Writer), which chronicled the relationship of Conde and Junquera publicly.

Selected works

Stories

Essays

Translations

References

Citations

Bibliography

1898 births
1986 deaths
People from Madrid
University of Valencia alumni
Bisexual writers
Spanish LGBT writers
20th-century LGBT people